Hillsborough was a constituency represented in the Irish House of Commons until 1800.

History
In the Patriot Parliament of 1689 summoned by James II, Hillsborough was not represented.

Members of Parliament, 1662–1801
1662–1666 Sir Robert Colville and Carrol Bolton

1689–1801

Notes

References

Bibliography

Constituencies of the Parliament of Ireland (pre-1801)
Historic constituencies in County Down
1662 establishments in Ireland
1800 disestablishments in Ireland
Constituencies established in 1662
Constituencies disestablished in 1800